Paracotalpa granicollis is a beetle of the family Scarabaeidae. The species is found in the Intermountain West of North America, including the Columbia Plateau, Great Basin, and Colorado Plateau.

Images

References 

Scarabaeidae
Beetles described in 1852
Taxa named by Samuel Stehman Haldeman